Jenesien is a comune (municipality) in the province of South Tyrol in northern Italy, located about  northwest of the city of Bolzano.

Geography

Jenesien borders the following municipalities: Bolzano, Mölten, Ritten, Sarntal, and Terlan.

Frazioni
The municipality of Jenesien contains the frazioni (subdivisions, mainly villages and hamlets) Afing (Avigna), Flaas (Valas), Glaning (Cologna) and Nobls (Montoppio).

History

Coat-of-arms
The emblem is argent party per bend and five piles of gules, coming out of the diagonal division. It is the insignia of the Lords of Goldegg who lived in the village from 1190 to 1473. The emblem was adopted in 1966.

Society

Linguistic distribution
According to the 2011 census, 97.79% of the population speak German, 3.07% Italian and 0.14% Ladin as first language.

Demographic evolution

Twin towns
Jenesien is twinned with:

  Feldkirchen-Westerham, Germany

References

External links
  Homepage of the municipality

Municipalities of South Tyrol